Newton H. Ewell is an artist whose work has appeared in role-playing games.

Early life
Newton Ewell was born in October 1962, in St. Louis, Missouri.

Ewell was intrinsic to the Sci-Fi and Convention scene in and around the Washington D.C. Area in the 1970s and 80's, widely known for the rare talent for rendering detailed illustrations of starships and space stations and related Sci-Fi Fantasy matter.

Career
Newton Ewell has done artwork for the Dungeons & Dragons role-playing game, including interior art for the Treasure Maps set (1992), and was an interior artist for both SJR2 Realmspace (1991) and SJR7 Krynnspace (1992), as well as the War Captains Companion (1992). He also designed ships and created map art for SJR2 Realmspace. Additionally, he has a design credit for both the MC7 Monstrous Compendium Spelljammer Appendix (1990), and the MC9 Monstrous Compendium Spelljammer Appendix II (1991), and was the author of HWR2 Kingdom of Nithia (1991). He also worked as an editor on projects such as Wild Things (1990), Vikings Campaign Sourcebook (1991), Dark Sun's The Complete Gladiator's Handbook (1992), and AC1010 Poor Wizard's Almanac & Book of Facts (1992).

References

External links
 

1962 births
Artists from St. Louis
Living people
Role-playing game artists